Presentation Public School is situated at Jugial, 12 km from the city of Pathankot (Punjab). Established in 2000, the school is affiliated to the Central Board of Secondary Education, Delhi and runs classes from nursery to class XII. Run under the aegis of J.M.M. Educational Trust, Presentation Public School caters to the educational needs of this rural area of Jugial and adjoining towns of Dhar, Madhopur and Sujanpur.

External links 
 presentationjugial.com

Educational institutions established in 2000
Gurdaspur district
High schools and secondary schools in Punjab, India
2000 establishments in Punjab, India